Many ships have been named Pearl including:

 The Pearl, a schooner in the Pearl incident, an 1848 slave escape attempt
 , a cruise ship built in 1967
 , a cruiseferry operated by DFDS Seaways (Seaways' Pearl cruise-ferry)
 Norwegian Pearl, a Norwegian Cruise Lines cruise ship built in 2006
 X-Press Pearl, an X-Press Feeders containership that sank off Sri Lanka in 2021
 , the name of several Royal Navy ships
 , the name of more than one United States Navy ship
 Black pearl, fictional ship in the Pirates of the Caribbean film series.

See also
 Pearl (disambiguation)

Ship names